Michael Barnett is an Australian former soccer player who played as a defender. He last played for Adelaide Raiders.

References

Living people
Australian soccer players
National Soccer League (Australia) players
West Adelaide SC players
Association football defenders
Year of birth missing (living people)